Aviva is an international insurance company based in the United Kingdom.

Aviva may also refer to:
Aviva Stadium, Dublin, built on the site of the former Lansdowne Road stadium
Aviva Tower, a building in London, now named St. Helen's
Aviva (given name), a female first name
 , a motor yacht built in 2007
 , a motor yacht built in 2017
Aviva (musician)
Aviva (film), a 2020 film by Boaz Yakin
Singlife with Aviva, a Singaporean insurance company with Aviva as a shareholder